WGOH (1370 AM is a radio station licensed to Grayson, Kentucky. WGOH broadcasts a full service mix of classic country and bluegrass music. The station serves northeast Kentucky and is owned by Carter County Broadcasting Co., Inc. WGOH features programming from CBS News Radio and the Kentucky News Network as well as broadcast football and basketball games from both East Carter and West Carter High Schools. The station has won four National Crystal Radio Awards for community service. Former staff included Tom T. Hall (DJ), Jim Phillips (DJ & News Director), Jim's Son Mike Phillips (DJ & Music/Program Director) & Carmel Steven's (DJ). Current staff include Jeff Roe (Station Manager), Matt Shufflebarger (News Director), Mike Nelson (Program Director)

Translator

References

External links

GOH
Full service radio stations in the United States
Classic country radio stations in the United States
Radio stations established in 1959
1959 establishments in Kentucky
Carter County, Kentucky